Kitwe United Football Club is a Zambian football club based in Kitwe. They play in the first division of Zambian football. Their home stadium is Garden Park. Returned to premier League in 2018, winning Coach Ghanaian born Ernest Kofi, Captain Moses Lolozi, Technical Director Andrew C Katebe.
Demoted to national League during the transitional league 2019 and returned to premier league in 2020 winning coach Steven Mwansa, Captain Moses Lolozi, Technical Directed Andrew C Katebe.

Achievements
Zambian Challenge Cup: 2: 1971,
1991 Promotion to Division 1-Winning Coach-Goodwell Kabanda, Captain-Andrew c Katebe. 2002 Promotion to Premier League-winning Coach-Andrew C Katebe, Captain-Chisala Mwandama. 2004 BP Top 8 Champions-winning Coach-Peter Kaumba, Captain-Felix Mangwato.
The team got Demoted to Division one in 2006, but returned to premier league in 2018, Winning coach Ghanaian born Ernest Kofi, captain Moses Lolozi, Technical Directed Andrew C Katebe.In the 2018-2019 transitional season the team was relegated to National division 1 league, but they bounced back a yr later in 2019-2020 season. Winning Coach Steven Mwansa, Captain Moses Lolozi, Technical directed Andrew C Katebe.

References

Football clubs in Zambia
Kitwe